The men's singles of the 2015 Advantage Cars Prague Open tournament was played on clay in Prague, Czech Republic.

Diego Schwartzman was the defending champion, but chose not to participate.

Rogério Dutra Silva won the tournament, defeating Radu Albot in the final, 6–2, 6–7(5–7), 6–4.

Seeds

  Albert Ramos-Viñolas (second round)
  Andreas Haider-Maurer (second round)
  Simone Bolelli (quarterfinals)
  Steve Darcis (quarterfinals)
  Aleksandr Nedovyesov (first round)
  Radu Albot (final)
  Daniel Muñoz de la Nava (second round)
  Jan-Lennard Struff (first round)

Draw

Finals

Top half

Bottom half

References

External Links
 Main Draw
 Qualifying draw

2015 Singles
Advantage Cars Prague Open